Count Only the Happy Moments (Swedish: Räkna de lyckliga stunderna blott) is a 1944 Swedish historical drama film directed by Rune Carlsten and starring Sonja Wigert, Arnold Sjöstrand and Olof Widgren. It was shot at the Centrumateljéerna Studios in Stockholm and on location in the Old Town and in Uppsala. The film's sets were designed by the art director Bertil Duroj. It is based on a short story by Guy de Maupassant.

Synopsis
Dressmaker Annemarie falls in love with rising businessman Viktor Branzell, but his middle-class family disapprove of her humble origins.

Cast
 Sonja Wigert as 	Annemarie Wikström
 Arnold Sjöstrand as 	Viktor Branzell
 Olof Widgren as 	Bengt Ljung
 Hugo Björne as 	Branzell Sr.
 Gerda Lundequist as 	Mrs. Branzell
 Åke Grönberg as Sven Bergling
 John Ekman as 	Benson
 Barbro Ribbing as 	Harriet Benson
 Yngve Nordwall as 	Ragnar Normark
 Tekla Sjöblom as 	Mrs. Normark
 Birger Malmsten as 	Helge Wikström
 Britta Holmberg as 	Ingrid
 Curt Masreliez as 	Alf Branzell
 Anita Björk as Lilian Lind
 John Westin  as Karsten
 Eva Dahlbeck as 	Hedvig
 Ruth Weijden as Charlotte 
 Magnus Rudbeck as Variety singer
 Wiktor Andersson as 	Groom 
 Olof Bergström as 	Speaker at the engagement dinner
 Millan Bolander as 	Nurse
 Mona Geijer-Falkner as Annemarie's landlady
 Gunnar Johansson as Band leader at Sveasalen
 Henrik Schildt as Student
 Eva Stiberg as Normark's maid

References

Bibliography 
 Qvist, Per Olov & von Bagh, Peter. Guide to the Cinema of Sweden and Finland. Greenwood Publishing Group, 2000.

External links 
 

1944 films
1944 drama films
1940s Swedish-language films
Films directed by Rune Carlsten
Swedish black-and-white films
1940s historical drama films
Swedish historical drama films
Films set in the 19th century
1940s Swedish films